The 1991 Winter Universiade, the XV Winter Universiade, took place in Sapporo, Japan.

Venues

Medal table

1991
U
Winter Universiade
U
Multi-sport events in Japan
Sports competitions in Sapporo
March 1991 sports events in Asia
Winter sports competitions in Japan
20th century in Sapporo